Tatyanovka is a rural locality (a settlement) in Nikolayevsky Selsoviet, Blagoveshchensky District, Altai Krai, Russia. The population was 348 as of 2013. There are 2 streets.

Geography 
Tatyanovka is located 33 km northeast of Blagoveshchenka (the district's administrative centre) by road. Nikolayevka is the nearest rural locality.

References 

Rural localities in Blagoveshchensky District, Altai Krai